Communauté d'agglomération de Nevers is the communauté d'agglomération, an intercommunal structure, centred on the town of Nevers. It is located in the Nièvre department, in the Bourgogne-Franche-Comté region, central France. Created in 2003, its seat is in Nevers. Its area is 250.0 km2. Its population was 65,440 in 2019, of which 33,005 in Nevers proper.

Composition
The communauté d'agglomération consists of the following 39 communes:

Challuy
Coulanges-lès-Nevers
Fourchambault
Garchizy
Germigny-sur-Loire
Gimouille
Marzy
Nevers
Parigny-les-Vaux
Pougues-les-Eaux
Saincaize-Meauce
Sermoise-sur-Loire
Varennes-Vauzelles

References

Nevers
Nevers